Risealeaana "Risi" Pouri-Lane (born 28 May 2000) is a New Zealand rugby sevens player. She captained the 2018 Youth Olympics squad that won gold in Buenos Aires. She also won gold medals with the Black Ferns sevens team at the 2018 Commonwealth Games and the 2020 Summer Olympics.

Rugby career

2018 
Pouri-Lane captained the New Zealand sevens team as they won gold at the 2018 Youth Olympics in Buenos Aires. She then joined the Black Ferns Sevens team and won a gold medal at the 2018 Commonwealth Games.

2021–2022 
Pouri-Lane won a gold medal with the Black Ferns Sevens at the Tokyo Olympics in 2021. She was named in the Black Ferns Sevens squad for the 2022 Commonwealth Games in Birmingham. She won a bronze medal at the event. She later won a silver medal at the 2022 Rugby World Cup Sevens in Cape Town.

Personal life 
Pouri-Lane is of Māori descent and affiliates to the Ngāti Kuia, Ngāti Koata, Ngāi Tahu iwi. She attended Motueka High School where she graduated in 2017.

See also
List of Youth Olympic Games gold medalists who won Olympic gold medals

References

External links 

 Black Ferns sevens Profile

2000 births
Living people
New Zealand female rugby sevens players
New Zealand women's international rugby sevens players
Rugby sevens players at the 2018 Commonwealth Games
Commonwealth Games rugby sevens players of New Zealand
Commonwealth Games gold medallists for New Zealand
People educated at Motueka High School
Olympic gold medalists for New Zealand
Rugby sevens players at the 2020 Summer Olympics
Medalists at the 2020 Summer Olympics
Olympic medalists in rugby sevens
Olympic rugby sevens players of New Zealand
Rugby sevens players at the 2018 Summer Youth Olympics
Youth Olympic gold medalists for New Zealand
21st-century New Zealand women
Rugby sevens players at the 2022 Commonwealth Games
Medallists at the 2022 Commonwealth Games